The Open Genealogy Alliance (OGA) is a UK-based project launched by three partners: the Open Rights Group, Open Knowledge Foundation and FreeBMD. OGA is currently researching the genealogy sector and the copyright status of digitized public domain documents. The project was announced on 2 March 2011 by the Open Rights Group.

See also
Digitization of books
Digitizing
Electronic Frontier Foundation
Open Rights Group
Public domain image resources

References

External links
Open Genealogy Alliance website
Open Rights Group website

Genealogical societies
Public domain
Copyright campaigns
Copyright examinations
Copyright law organizations